The 1996 Japanese Touring Car Championship season was the 12th edition of the series. It began at Fuji Speedway on 7 April and finished after seven events, also at Fuji Speedway on 3 November. The championship was won by Naoki Hattori, driving for Mooncraft.

Teams & Drivers

Calendar

Championship Standings
Points were awarded 15, 12, 9, 7, 6, 5, 4, 3, 2, 1 to the top 10 finishers in each race, with no bonus points for pole positions or fastest laps. Drivers counted their ten best scores.

References

Touring Car Championship
Japanese Touring Car Championship seasons